is a private university in Minato, Tokyo, Japan. Jikei (慈恵) means mercy and love in Japanese.

Access
The Nishi-Shinbashi Campus is about a 3-minute walk from Onarimon Station and about a 10-minute walk from Uchisaiwaichō Station both on the Toei Mita Line. It is about a 7-minute walk from Kamiyachō Station on the Tokyo Metro Hibiya Line and about a 10-minute walk from Toranomon Station on the Tokyo Metro Ginza Line. The nearest JR station, Shinbashi Station, is about 12 minutes away on foot.

The Kokuryō Campus in Chōfu, Tokyo is about a 10-minute walk from Kokuryō Station on the Keiō Line.

The three major private medical schools in Japan
Keio University School of Medicine
The Jikei University School of Medicine
Nippon Medical School

External links
 Official website 

Minato, Tokyo
Educational institutions established in 1881
Private universities and colleges in Japan
Universities and colleges in Tokyo
1881 establishments in Japan
Medical schools in Japan